Avseyenko is a Russian last name, a variant of Yevseyev. It is shared by the following people:
Natalie Avseenko (Natalya Avseyenko), former free diving champion featured in a photographic series illustrating the Orda Cave, a gypsum crystal cave underneath the western Ural Mountains
Oxana Avseyenko, Kazakhstani cross country skier who participated in the 1994 IAAF World Cross Country Championships – Junior women's race
Vasily Avseenko (Vasily Avseyenko) (1842–1913), Russian literary critic, writer, and journalist

References

Notes

Sources
И. М. Ганжина (I. M. Ganzhina). "Словарь современных русских фамилий" (Dictionary of Modern Russian Last Names). Москва, 2001. 



Russian-language surnames